Brentsville Historic District is a national historic district located near Bristow, at Brentsville, Prince William County, Virginia. It encompasses 23 contributing buildings and 2 contributing sites in the village of Brentsville platted in 1822.  These include the former Brentsville Courthouse and Jail, a one-room school (1928), three churches, 11 houses, one ruins of a dwelling, a tavern square site, and 14 outbuildings.

It was added to the National Register of Historic Places in 1990.

References

Historic districts in Prince William County, Virginia
Federal architecture in Virginia
Greek Revival architecture in Virginia
National Register of Historic Places in Prince William County, Virginia
Historic districts on the National Register of Historic Places in Virginia
1990 establishments in Virginia